Benstock is an English surname. Notable people with this surname include:

 Bernard Benstock (1930–1994), American literary critic
 Danny Benstock (born 1970), English footballer
 Shari Benstock (1944–2015), American literary scholar, pen name of Shari Gabrielson Goodmann

English-language surnames